Anthroponosis may refer to:
Human-to-human transmission
Reverse zoonosis